Wace is a surname. Notable people by that name include:

 Wace (c. 1110 – after 1174), Norman poet.
 Alan Wace (1879–1957), English archaeologist.
 Henry Wace (footballer) (1853–1947), English international footballer.
 Henry Wace (priest) (1836–1924), principal of King's College, London, and Dean of Canterbury.
 Ian Wace, British financier.
 Muriel Wace, English children's book author.
 Nigel Morritt Wace (1929–2005), authority on the plant life of Tristan da Cunha.
 Rupert Wace (born 1955), British dealer in antiquities.